Eastbrook railway station is a railway station serving the Eastbrook area of Dinas Powys, a village near Cardiff, South Wales.

Passenger services are operated by Transport for Wales as part of the Valley Lines network. It is one of the more recent additions to the route, being opened by British Rail in 1986.

Services
The typical Monday-Saturday off-peak service from Eastbrook is:

2 tph which terminate at Merthyr Tydfil, calling at Cogan, Grangetown, Cardiff Central, Cardiff Queen Street, Cathays, Llandaf, Radyr, Taffs Well, Trefforest Estate, Trefforest, Pontypridd, Abercynon, Quakers Yard, Merthyr Vale, Troed-y-rhiw and Pentre-bach. This journey takes 76 minutes.
2 tph which terminate at Aberdare, calling at Cogan, Grangetown, Cardiff Central, Cardiff Queen Street, Cathays, Llandaf, Radyr, Taffs Well, Trefforest, Pontypridd, Abercynon, Penrhiwceiber, Mountain Ash, Fernhill and Cwmbach. This journey takes 78 minutes.
3 tph which terminate at Barry Island, calling at Dinas Powys, Cadoxton, Barry Docks and Barry. This journey takes 22 minutes.
1 tph which terminates at Bridgend, calling at Dinas Powys, Cadoxton, Barry Docks, Barry, Rhoose for Cardiff International Airport and Llantwit Major. This journey takes 49 minutes.

These services combine to give 4 tph to Cardiff Central, Cardiff Queen Street and stations to Pontypridd (excluding Trefforest Estate) and 4 tph to Barry. In the evening, trains run every 30 minutes each way and on Sundays there are 2 tph to Barry Island, one every 2 hours to Bridgend and either two or three per hour to Cardiff.

References

External links

Railway stations in the Vale of Glamorgan
DfT Category F2 stations
Railway stations opened by British Rail
Railway stations in Great Britain opened in 1986
Railway stations served by Transport for Wales Rail